McKissack & McKissack is an American architecture, engineering, program management and construction firm based in Washington, D.C. It is the oldest minority-owned architecture and construction company in the United States.

The firm was founded in 1905 in Nashville, Tennessee by Moses McKissack, the grandson of a slave who had been brought to the United States from west Africa and put to work making bricks. Moses III, the slave's grandson, became an accomplished carpenter and eventually teamed with his brother Calvin McKissack to found the company.

The company's best-known projects are the Carnegie Library at Fisk University, built in 1908; the Nationals Park baseball stadium, the National Museum of African American History and Culture to the Martin Luther King, Jr. Memorial, the Obama Presidential Center in Chicago and a helicopter landing pad at the George H.W. Bush Presidential Library in College Station, TX. They have also participated in airport renovation and modernization projects at John F. Kennedy International and LaGuardia airports in New York, O'Hare International and Midway International in Chicago and Ronald Reagan Washington National and Dulles International airports in Washington.

In 2019 the company was named a Top 50 Program Management and a Top 100 Construction Management-for-Fee firm by Engineering News-Record.

History
The firm was founded by Moses McKissack III (May 8, 1879 – December 12, 1952) in 1905, who was later joined by his brother Calvin Lunsford McKissack (February 23, 1890 – March 2, 1968) to form the McKissack & McKissack partnership in 1922. The brothers were natives of Pulaski, Tennessee. Their father and paternal grandfather were trained builders. 

Moses McKissack entered the architecture trade by working as an apprentice to a builder in Pulaski who hired him in 1890 to assist with architectural designs, drawings and construction work. His formal education was obtained at the Pulaski Colored High School. Calvin McKissack was educated at Barrows School in Springfield, Massachusetts, and Fisk University in Nashville, which he attended from 1905 to 1909. Both brothers obtained architectural degrees through a correspondence course.

Early projects
Between 1895 and 1905, Moses McKissack built houses in Decatur, Alabama, and Mount Pleasant and Columbia, Tennessee. In 1905, he received a commission to build a new house for the dean of architecture and engineering at Vanderbilt University in Nashville. He opened his first architectural office in Nashville and quickly picked up additional jobs designing and building other homes in the West End. The firm's first major project was design of the Carnegie Library on the Fisk University campus. This is a two-story Classic Revival building constructed from brick with a stone columned porch, featuring an interior light well; its cornerstone was laid in 1908 by William Howard Taft, then the U.S. Secretary of War. Major projects designed by Moses McKissack during the 1910s included the main campus building for the Turner Normal and Industrial School for Negroes in Shelbyville, Tennessee and dormitories for Roger Williams University in Nashville and Lane College in Jackson, Tennessee. By 1920, Moses McKissack had acquired design clients throughout Nashville. Between 1918 and 1922 he designed more than one dozen residences in Nashville and Belle Meade, largely in the Colonial Revival style.

Calvin McKissack, who had worked with his older brother in Nashville, started an independent practice in Dallas, Texas, in 1912, specializing in the design and construction of dormitories and churches. In 1915, he returned to Tennessee, becoming superintendent of industries and a teacher of architectural drawing at the Tennessee Agricultural and Industrial State Normal School. Three years later, he joined the faculty of Pearl High School as director of the industrial arts department, and later became first executive secretary of the Tennessee State Association of Teachers in Colored Schools.

After Tennessee instituted a registration law for architects in 1921, the McKissack brothers became two of the first registered architects in the state. Moses' granddaughter Cheryl said in an interview that state licensing authorities were reluctant to let the brothers take the licensing exam, but decided to allow it based on the expectation that they would fail. After they passed easily, the state authorities balked at giving them licenses, but relented after reports of the situation were published in national news media.

Establishment of partnership
In 1922, Calvin McKissack resigned his job with the teachers organization and the brothers established the partnership of McKissack & McKissack. In 1924, the National Baptist Convention, U.S.A, Inc., hired the firm to design the Morris Memorial Building to house the Nashville offices of the denomination's Sunday School Publishing Board. After the building was completed in 1925, the McKissack firm moved its offices into that building, where they remained for many years. In 1927 the McKissacks designed the main library of Tennessee State University in Nashville. During the 1930s they received Works Progress Administration contracts for design of several public school buildings in the city, including Washington Junior High School on Nineteenth Avenue North (demolished), Pearl High School, and Ford Green School.

Around 1940, the firm began to expand outside Tennessee. Architectural licensing boards in some other states were skeptical of the qualifications of black architects. Tennessee authorities responded to their concerns with a statement that McKissack and McKissack was "...somewhat unique in the fact that it is one of the few Negro architectural firms in the country" and had "done some creditable work in Nashville, including several large school buildings running into a total cost of several hundred thousand dollars". The firm received licenses from Alabama in 1941 and from Georgia, South Carolina, Florida, and Mississippi in 1943. In 1942, the McKissack won a $5.7 million U.S. federal government contract to design and build Tuskegee Army Airfield, home to the Tuskegee Airmen's 99th Pursuit Squadron, in Tuskegee, Alabama. At the time, this was the largest federal contract ever awarded to a black-owned company. The successful on-time completion of the project brought positive attention to the company, including one writer's observation that "no racial friction occurred" in the work force of 1,600, of whom about three-fourths were black and one-fourth white. During the 1940s the firm also designed several public housing projects around the country, and Moses McKissack was appointed to President Franklin Roosevelt's White House Conference on Housing Problems. In 1942 the brothers were awarded the Spaulding Medal, recognizing the outstanding Negro business firm in the U.S.

Moses McKissack III died on December 12, 1952; McKissack Middle School in Nashville was named in his honor in 1954. Calvin McKissack remained with the firm until his death in 1968. William DeBerry McKissack, the youngest son of Moses III, then succeeded his uncle as president of the firm. After suffering a stroke, he retired due to illness, and his wife, Leatrice Buchanan McKissack, became chief executive officer. Under her leadership, the firm won major contracts for new buildings and renovations at the Fisk University, Tennessee State University and Meharry Medical College campuses in Nashville, as well as a $50 million renovation project for Howard University in Washington, D.C., and design of the National Civil Rights Museum in Memphis.

National expansion and move from Nashville
McKissack & McKissack opened an office in Washington, D.C. in 1990, headed by Deryl McKissack, one of the three daughters of William and Leatrice McKissack. Offices in Chicago and Los Angeles were opened in 2002 and 2008, respectively. The firm's operations in Nashville were terminated in 2002, with spin-off companies headed by William and  Leatrice McKissack's daughters continuing in other cities. As of 2013, the family-owned successor companies were reported to have more than 150 professional staff members and over $15 billion in projects. Corporate headquarters of McKissack & McKissack Corporate are in New York City; other offices are in Birmingham, Alabama; Bridgeport, Connecticut; Memphis, and Philadelphia. Cheryl McKissack Daniel, twin sister of Deryl McKissack, heads the New York operations. The Washington, D.C., unit headed by Deryl McKissack is a separate business that also has offices in Chicago, Miami, and Baltimore.

Works
As of 1975 McKissack & McKissack had completed over 3,000 building projects, including about 2,000 churches. Several buildings designed by Moses McKissack, Calvin McKissack, or the McKissack & McKissack firm are listed on the National Register of Historic Places (NRHP).

As Moses McKissack III 
Carnegie Library (1908), 17th Avenue North, Fisk University campus, Nashville, Tennessee. NRHP-listed.
House residence (1919), 340 Chesterfield, Nashville, Tennessee
George Hubbard House (1920), 1109 First Avenue South, Nashville. Colonial Revival, NRHP-listed.
Comer residence (1920), 1411 Eastland Avenue, Nashville, Tennessee
Bastian residence (1921), 3722 Central Avenue, Nashville, Tennessee
Sexton residence (1921), 3506 Byron Avenue, Nashville, Tennessee

As McKissack & McKissack 
Capers C.M.E. Church (1925), 319 15th Ave., N. Nashville, Tennessee. Completed in 1925. NRHP-listed.
Morris Memorial Building (1925), 330 Charlotte Ave., Nashville, Tennessee. NRHP-listed.
National Civil Rights Museum (1925), Memphis, Tennessee
Washington Junior High (1927), Nashville, Tennessee
Tennessee State University Memorial Library (1927), Nashville, Tennessee
C.M.E. Publishing House (1931–1970s), Jackson, Tennessee. Art Deco; demolished in the 1970s.
A.M.E. Publishing House, Eighth Avenue South, Nashville, Tennessee. Art Deco; demolished in the 1970s.
Bridgeforth High School (1936), 1095 Bledsoe Road, Pulaski, Tennessee.  NRHP-listed.
Ford Green Elementary (1937), Nashville, Tennessee
Pearl High School (1937), 613 17th Avenue North, Nashville, Tennessee. NRHP-listed.
Henry Allen and Georgia Bradford Boyd House (1930s), 1601 Meharry Boulevard, Nashville, Tennessee  
Cameron School (1940), 1034 First Avenue South, Nashville, Tennessee. NRHP-listed.
St. John's Baptist Church (1940), 1328 N.W. 3rd Ave., Miami, Florida.  NRHP-listed.
President's House at Texas College (1942), 2404 North Grand Avenue, Tyler, Texas. NRHP-listed.
Taborian Hospital (1942), US 61, jct. of McGinnis St., Mound Bayou, Mississippi. NRHP-listed
D.R. Glass Library (1948) at Texas College, 2404 N. Grand Avenue, Tyler, Texas. NRHP-listed
Universal Life Insurance Company (1949), 480 Linden Ave., Memphis, Tennessee. NRHP-listed.

References

External links

McKissack & McKissack Corporate (New York)
McKissack & McKissack (Washington, DC)
McKissack and McKissack Architects, Tennessee Encyclopedia of History and Culture

Architecture firms based in Tennessee
African-American architects
American architects
Companies based in Nashville, Tennessee
Design companies established in 1905
Black-owned companies of the United States
People from Giles County, Tennessee
1905 establishments in Tennessee
Architecture firms based in New York City
African-American history in Nashville, Tennessee